Dmytro Oleksandrovych Yevstafiyev is a Ukrainian retired footballer.

Career
He began to play for Chornomorets-2 Odesa the second team of the city of Odessa in 2000. In 2004 he moved to Podillya Khmelnytskyi for two season, then he moved to Spartak Ivano-Frankivsk and again in Podillya Khmelnytskyi. In summer 2007, he moved to Mykolaiv and in January 2008 he moved to Desna Chernihiv the main club of the city of Chernihiv until 2009 where he played 36 matches. In summer 2009 he moved to Helios Kharkiv and in January 2010 he returned to Desna Chernihiv. In summer 2010 he moved to Helios Kharkiv, where he played 19 matches and in summer 2011 he moved to Naftovyk Okhtyrka for two season, playing 37 matches.

References

External links 
 Dmytro Evstafiev footballfacts.ru
 Dmytro Evstafiev allplayers.in.ua
 

1985 births
Living people
Sportspeople from Vinnytsia Oblast
FC Chornomorets-2 Odesa players
FC Podillya Khmelnytskyi players
FC Spartak Ivano-Frankivsk players
MFC Mykolaiv players
FC Desna Chernihiv players
FC Helios Kharkiv players
FC Naftovyk-Ukrnafta Okhtyrka players
Ukrainian footballers
Ukrainian First League players
Ukrainian Second League players
Ukrainian Amateur Football Championship players
Association football midfielders